Coach is a 1978 American sport comedy film directed by Bud Townsend and starring Cathy Lee Crosby, Michael Biehn, Keenan Wynn, Channing Clarkson, Steve Nevil, and Jack David Walker. The film was released by Crown International Pictures in March 1978.

Plot
Randy Rowlings, an Olympic gold medalist, is hired by a high school as a male basketball team coach. She meets with a negative attitude of teenagers. She faces a difficult task to overcome the reluctance of players and lead a weak team to victory.

Cast
Cathy Lee Crosby as Randy Rawlings
Michael Biehn as Jack Ripley
Keenan Wynn as Fenton 'F.R.' Granger
Channing Clarkson as Bradley William David Granger
Steve Nevil as Ralph
Jack David Walker as Ned
Meridith Baer as Janet
Myron McGill as Danny
Robyn Pohle as Candy
Kristine Greco as Darlene
Brent Huff as Keith
Cindy Daly as Wanda
Rosanne Katon as Sue
Lenka Novak as Marilyn
Otto Felix as Tom
Milt Oberman as Coach Bresnehan
Bill McLean as Harold Mitchell (as Bill McClean)
Patricia Garrison as Mrs. Granger
Ted Dawson as Marvin Chomsky
Nate Roth as Sam
Barbara Minkus as Miss Fishman
Ron Wright as Coach Gorman
Robert Webb as Stallion Player
Derek Barton as Bull Player
Tom Mahoney as Janitor
Mark Spencer as Referee
Tikki Goldberg as Secretary
Sidney Wicks as himself
Luther Fear as Asst. coach (uncredited)

Reception
In its first 60 days, the film grossed $2,735,822 from 74 theaters in the United States and Canada and went on to generate theatrical rentals of $2.2 million.

References

External links

1978 films
1970s sports comedy films
American sports comedy films
Crown International Pictures films
Films directed by Bud Townsend
Teen sex comedy films
1978 comedy films
1970s English-language films
1970s American films